"Let Me Go" is a song by American rock band 3 Doors Down. It was released on November 22, 2004, as the lead single from their third studio album, Seventeen Days (2005). The single reached number 14 on the US Billboard Hot 100 and Modern Rock Tracks charts and number six on the Billboard Mainstream Rock Tracks chart.

Writing
According to lead singer Brad Arnold, "Let Me Go" was originally written for the Spider-Man 2 soundtrack but didn't end up in the film's soundtrack. Arnold explained that "we liked it so much, we kept it for ourselves." Arnold wanted to keep the song, "because it also had meaning to me personally." Lyrically "Let Me Go" is a break-up song.

Music video
The music video was directed by Wayne Isham and features actors Jodi Lyn O'Keefe and Jesse Metcalfe as two young high school students whose relationship seems to be the ideal, but which soon is shattered by a devastating secret. Jodi appears to be nothing more than the average all-American type on the surface, but her secret night job as a stripper at a strip club called Jumbo's Clown Room shows a different side. Jesse, upon realizing this, acts coldly and eventually separates from her. The rest of the video shows them both showing remorse over this hasty decision. At the very end, Jesse discovers that Jodi's night efforts was only being used to support her final secret: her young baby daughter. Throughout the clip, the band is seen performing on a rainy city street illuminated with several backlights. In an interview with 3 Doors Down, it was revealed that a later idea was that Jodi hated being a stripper.

Track listings
US promo CD
 "Let Me Go" (rock version) – 4:00
 "Let Me Go" (alternate version) – 4:00

UK 7-inch single
A. "Let Me Go" (rock version) – 4:00
B. "Be Somebody" (acoustic) – 3:18

Australian CD single
 "Let Me Go" – 4:00
 "Be Somebody" (acoustic) – 3:18
 "Kryptonite" (live) – 4:14
 "That Smell" (live) – 6:01

Charts

Weekly charts

Year-end charts

Certifications

Release history

References

2005 singles
2005 songs
3 Doors Down songs
Island Records singles
Republic Records singles
Song recordings produced by Johnny K
Songs written by Brad Arnold
Songs written by Chris Henderson (American musician)
Songs written by Matt Roberts (musician)
Songs written by Todd Harrell